Michael John Ward (7 April 1931 – 25 March 2009) was a British Labour politician.

Ward was educated at Royal Liberty Grammar School, Romford and Manchester University. He became a local government advisor and director of a public relations firm. He was elected to Romford Borough Council in 1958, and was subsequently elected to its replacement, Havering London Borough Council, in 1964. He served as leader of the council at Havering from 1971 to 1974. He was a member of the Essex river authority from 1964 and local government officer at the Labour Party 1961–65.

Having contested the seat three times previously, losing by three votes in 1966 after seven recounts and by 22 votes in February 1974, Ward was elected as the Member of Parliament (MP) for Peterborough in the October 1974 general election, defeating the Conservative Party's incumbent Sir Harmar Nicholls. He served as Parliamentary Private Secretary to Reg Prentice, Secretary of State for Education and Science, and after Prentice left the government, Ward was PPS to Bill Rodgers, Minister of State in the Foreign Office. However, in 1979, Ward lost the marginal Peterborough seat to the Conservative Brian Mawhinney. Ward subsequently joined the Social Democratic Party (SDP) but later rejoined Labour, working for the Greenwich Constituency Labour Party. In 2005, his daughter Alison Seabeck was elected the Labour MP for Plymouth Devonport.

Ward also served as the chairman of Charlton Triangle Homes in South East London. He was also the chairman of the Greenwich Labour Party Local Government Committee from 1996 until 2000 and of the Rochester and Strood Labour Party from 2003 until 2007.

References 

Times Guide to the House of Commons 1979

Obituary, The Independent, 31 March 2009

External links 
 

1931 births
2009 deaths
People educated at the Royal Liberty Grammar School
Alumni of the University of Manchester
Labour Party (UK) MPs for English constituencies
Councillors in Greater London
Councillors in the London Borough of Havering
UK MPs 1974–1979
Social Democratic Party (UK) politicians